Tapluang Bor.Chor.Ror.2 (ทัพหลวง บชร.2) also known as Tapruwan Hadesworkout (タップロン・ハーデスワークアウト) in Japan is a Thai Muay Thai fighter and kickboxer.

Biography and career

On November 12, 2006 Tapluang defeated Singmanee Kaewsamrit by decision after knocking him down in the third round. Following this win Tapluang was top five ranked in the 140lbs division at Rajadamnern Stadium.

In 2007 Tapruwan traveled to Japan to compete at MAJKF KICK GUTS 2007. He defeated Sota by first round knockout to win the WMAF World Super Lightweight title.

One February 13, 2016 Tapruwan defeated the reigning Shoot Boxing Super Lightweight champion Hiroaki Suzuki by majority decision at SHOOT BOXING 2016 act.1.

On November 11, 2016 Tapruwan took part in the S-Cup -65kg World Tournament. In Quarter final he defeated Yosuke Mizuochi by TKO in the first round. He was eliminated in the next round by Zakaria Zouggary who defeated him by unanimous decision.

On March 10, 2019 Tapruwan defeated the reigning RISE Kickboxing Welterweight champion BeyNoah by first round knockout, he landed a perfect left hook two minutes and ten seconds into the fight.

On November 17, 2019 Tapruwan took part in the Zaimax one night 8-man Tournament put on by Japan Kickboxing Innovation. He won his quarter final fight by first round TKO against Yosuke Mizuochi. In Semi Final he defeated Masa Sato by unanimous decision. In the final he defeated Sho Ogawa by unanimous decision to win the tournament.

On September 23, 2021 Tapruwan faced the RISE Kickboxing Lightweight champion Kento Haraguchi at RISE WORLD SERIES 2021 Yokohama. He scored a knockdown in the second round with a knee to the head before losing the fight by TKO in the next round.

Titles and accomplishments
Japan Kickboxing Innovation
 2019 ZAIMAX Muay Thai -65kg Tournament Winner

World Muay Thai Council
 WMC World Featherweight Champion 

Martial Arts Japan Kickboxing Federation
 2007 WMAF World Super Lightweight Champion

Fight record

|-  style="text-align:center; background:#cfc;"
| 2022-08-21|| Win ||align=left| Hiroto Yamaguchi || Rise World Series 2022 Osaka || Osaka , Japan || TKO || 3||2:50
|-  style="text-align:center; background:#fbb;"
| 2022-01-22|| Loss||align=left| Chihiro Suzuki || KNOCK OUT 2022 vol.1 || Tokyo, Japan || KO (Punches)||1 ||2:17
|-  style="text-align:center; background:#fbb;"
| 2021-09-23|| Loss ||align=left| Kento Haraguchi || RISE WORLD SERIES 2021 Yokohama || Yokohama, Japan || TKO (Punches) || 3 || 1:35

|-  style="text-align:center; background:#cfc;"
| 2021-07-11 || Win || align=left| Tetsuya Yamato || NJKF - Yamato Gym 50th Anniversary Yamato Matsuri  || Nagoya, Japan || TKO (Doctor Stoppage) || 1 || 2:32 

|-  style="text-align:center; background:#cfc;"
| 2020-02-11 || Win|| align=left| Shinji Suzuki || KNOCK OUT CHAMPIONSHIP.1 || Tokyo, Japan || Decision (Unanimous) || 3 || 3:00

|-  style="text-align:center; background:#cfc;"
| 2019-11-17 || Win|| align=left| Sho Ogawa || Japan Kickboxing Innovation 6 - ZAIMAX MUAYTHAI -65kg Tournament Final|| Okayama, Japan || Decision (Unanimous) || 3 || 3:00
|-
! style=background:white colspan=9 |

|-  style="text-align:center; background:#cfc;"
| 2019-11-17 || Win|| align=left| Masa Sato || Japan Kickboxing Innovation - ZAIMAX MUAYTHAI -65kg Tournament, Semi Final|| Okayama, Japan || Decision (Unanimous) || 3 || 3:00

|-  style="text-align:center; background:#cfc;"
| 2019-11-17 || Win|| align=left| Yosuke Mizuochi || Japan Kickboxing Innovation - ZAIMAX MUAYTHAI -65kg Tournament, Quarter Final|| Okayama, Japan || TKO (Punches)|| 1 || 2:16

|- align="center"  bgcolor="#fbb"
| 2019-09-16|| Loss||align=left| BeyNoah|| RISE World Series 2019 Final Round|| Tokyo, Japan || Ext.R Decision (Unanimous) || 4|| 3:00

|-  style="text-align:center; background:#fbb;"
| 2019-07-21|| Loss ||align=left| Kosei Yamada || RISE World Series Semi Finals || Tokyo, Japan || Decision (Majority) || 3 || 3:00

|- align="center"  bgcolor="#cfc"
| 2019-03-10|| Win||align=left| BeyNoah|| RISE World Series 2019 First Round|| Tokyo, Japan || KO (Left Hook) || 1|| 

|- align="center"  bgcolor="#cfc"
| 2018-12-23|| Win||align=left| Yuya Yamato || Hoost Cup Kings Nagoya 5 || Nagoya, Japan || Decision (Unanimous) || 3 || 3:00 

|- align="center"  bgcolor="#c5d2ea"
| 2018-09-08|| Draw||align=left| Kenta || KNOCK OUT 2018 OSAKA 2nd || Osaka, Japan || Decision (Majority) || 5 || 3:00 

|- align="center"  bgcolor="#fbb"
| 2018-02-10 || Loss || align=left| Kaito Ono || SHOOT BOXING 2018 act.1 || Tokyo, Japan || KO (Punches & Knees)|| 4 || 2:36

|- align="center"  bgcolor="#fbb"
| 2017-11-26|| Loss ||align=left| Katsuki Kitano || HOOST CUP KINGS OSAKA 2 || Osaka, Japan || Ext.R Decision (Unanimous) || 4 || 3:00 

|- align="center"  bgcolor="#fbb"
| 2017-10-18|| Loss||align=left| Jin Sijun || Japan Kickboxing Innovation - Okayama Gym show|| Okayama, Japan ||  Decision (Majority) || 3 || 3:00 

|-  style="text-align:center; background:#cfc;"
| 2016-12-23 || Win|| align=left| Yuya Oohara || ACCEL vol.35|| Kobe, Japan || TKO || 2 || 2:57

|- align="center"  bgcolor="#fbb"
| 2016-11-11 || Loss || align=left| Zakaria Zouggary || SHOOT BOXING WORLD TOURNAMENT S-Cup 2016, Semi Final || Tokyo, Japan || Decision (Unanimous)|| 3 || 3:00

|-  style="text-align:center; background:#cfc;"
| 2016-11-11 || Win|| align=left| Yosuke Mizuochi || SHOOT BOXING WORLD TOURNAMENT S-Cup 2016, Quarter Final|| Tokyo, Japan || TKO (Right Hook)|| 1 || 0:40

|-  style="text-align:center; background:#cfc;"
| 2016-10-09 || Win|| align=left| Tiger Ikuo || Japan Kickboxing Innovation 3|| Okayama, Japan || Decision (Unanimous) || 3 || 3:00

|- align="center"  bgcolor="#cfc"
| 2016-06-05 || Win|| align=left| MASAYA || SHOOT BOXING 2016 act.3 || Tokyo, Japan || KO (Left Cross)|| 3 || 0:25

|- align="center"  bgcolor="#fbb"
| 2016-04-03 || Loss || align=left| UMA || SHOOT BOXING 2016: Act 2 || Tokyo, Japan || TKO (Punches) || 2 || 0:42

|- align="center"  bgcolor="#cfc"
| 2016-02-13 || Win || align=left| Hiroaki Suzuki || SHOOT BOXING 2016: Act 1 || Tokyo, Japan || Decision (Unanimous) || 3 || 3:00

|- align="center"  bgcolor="#fbb"
| 2015-08-22|| Loss ||align=left| Christian Baya || SHOOT BOXING 30th Anniversary “CAESAR TIME!” World Tournament, Semi Final || Tokyo, Japan || Ext.R KO (Right Hook) || 4 || 0:37

|- align="center"  bgcolor="#cfc"
| 2015-06-21 || Win || align=left| Hiroaki Suzuki || Shoot Boxing 2015 SB 30th Anniversary || Tokyo, Japan || Decision (Unanimous) || 3 || 3:00

|- align="center"  bgcolor="#cfc"
| 2015-03-21 || Win || align=left| Joichiro Shimo || RISE 104 || Tokyo, Japan || KO || 2 || 2:53

|- align="center"  bgcolor="#cfc"
| 2014-10-26 || Win|| align=left| UMA ||REBELS.31 || Tokyo, Japan ||  Decision (Unanimous) || 3 || 3:00 

|- align="center"  bgcolor="#cfc"
| 2014-07-12 || Win || align=left| Naoki || RISE 100 ~BLADE 0~ || Tokyo, Japan || Decision (Unanimous) || 3 || 3:00

|- align="center"  bgcolor="#fbb"
| 2014-03-30 || Loss|| align=left| Yasuomi Soda || RISE 98 || Tokyo, Japan || Decision (Unanimous) || 3 || 3:00

|- align="center"  bgcolor="#cfc"
| 2014-02-09 || Win|| align=left|  ||Shoot Boxing || Japan || KO (Left Hook) || 2 || 

|- align="center"  bgcolor="#cfc"
| 2013-12-23|| Win || align=left| Shinsuke Hirai || SHOOT BOXING  || Osaka, Japan || Decision (Unanimous)|| 3 || 3:00

|- align="center"  bgcolor="#fbb"
| 2012-02-05 || Loss|| align=left| Yusuke Sugawara || SHOOT BOXING 2012 ～Road to S-cup～ act.1 || Tokyo, Japan || Ext.R Decision (Unanimous) || 4 || 3:00

|- align="center"  bgcolor="#cfc"
| 2011-01-30|| Win || align=left| Masatoshi Hyakutake || SHOOT BOXING Young Caesar Cup OSAKA 2011 || Osaka, Japan || Decision (Unanimous)|| 3 || 3:00

|- align="center"  bgcolor="#cfc"
| 2010-09-18|| Win || align=left| Hiroaki Suzuki || SHOOT BOXING 25TH ANNIVERSARY SERIES -ISHIN- 4  || Tokyo, Japan || Decision (Majority)|| 5 || 3:00

|-  style="background:#cfc;"
| 2007-08-12 || Win ||align=left| Sota || MAJKF KICK GUTS 2007 || Tokyo, Japan || KO (Left Hook) || 1||0:38 
|-
! style=background:white colspan=9 |

|-  style="background:#fbb;"
| 2007-04-01 || Loss ||align=left| Komkaew Sitromsai || Chujaroen, Rajadamnern Stadium || Bangkok, Thailand || KO || 4|| 

|-  style="background:#cfc;"
| 2007-02-13 || Win ||align=left| Attaphon Fairtex || Chujaroen, Rajadamnern Stadium || Bangkok, Thailand || Decision || 5|| 3:00

|-  bgcolor="#cfc"
| 2006-11-12 || Win ||align=left| Singmanee Sor.Srisompong || Chujarean, Rajadamnern Stadium || Bangkok, Thailand || Decision || 5 || 3:00

|-  bgcolor="#cfc"
| 2006-02-09 || Win ||align=left| Singmanee Sor.Srisompong || Daorungchujarean, Rajadamnern Stadium || Bangkok, Thailand || Decision || 5 || 3:00

|-  style="background:#fbb;"
| 2004-09-30 || Loss ||align=left| Jaroenchai Kesagym || Daorungchujaroen, Rajadamnern Stadium || Bangkok, Thailand || Decision || 5||3:00 

|-  bgcolor="#cfc"
| 2004-09-01 || Win ||align=left| Duangprateep SasiprapaGym || Jarumueang, Rajadamnern Stadium || Bangkok, Thailand || Decision || 5 || 3:00 

|-  bgcolor="#cfc"
| 2004-07-28 || Win ||align=left| Reurob Nor.Sripung || Daorungchujarean + Jarumueang, Rajadamnern Stadium || Bangkok, Thailand || KO || 4 || 

|-  bgcolor="#cfc"
| 2004-05-30 || Win||align=left| Katsumori Maita || SNKA Super-Hybrid  || Tokyo, Japan || Decision (Unanimous) || 3 || 3:00

|-  bgcolor="#cfc"
| 2004-04-14 || Win||align=left| Singmanee Sor.Srisompong  || Daorungchujarean, Rajadamnern Stadium || Bangkok, Thailand || Decision || 5 || 3:00

|-  bgcolor="#cfc"
| 2004-03-11 || Win ||align=left| Suwitnoi Sor Wanchat || Daorungchujarean, Rajadamnern Stadium || Bangkok, Thailand || Decision || 5 || 3:00 

|-  bgcolor="#fbb"
| 2004-01-24 || Loss ||align=left| Panmongkol Keertisangat || Daorungchujarean + Jarumueang, Rajadamnern Stadium || Bangkok, Thailand || Decision || 5 || 3:00 

|-  bgcolor="#fbb"
| 2003-12-10 || Loss ||align=left| Singmanee Sor.Srisompong || Petchmahanak, Rajadamnern Stadium || Bangkok, Thailand || Decision || 5 || 3:00

|-  bgcolor="#cfc"
| 2003-11-03 || Win ||align=left| Rambo Panyathip || Daorungchujarean + Jarumueang, Rajadamnern Stadium || Bangkok, Thailand || KO || 3 || 

|-  bgcolor="#cfc"
| 2003-08-06 || Win ||align=left| Teerachai Muangsurin || Daorungchujarean, Rajadamnern Stadium || Bangkok, Thailand || Decision || 5 || 3:00
|-
| colspan=9 | Legend:

References

Living people
1983 births
Tapruwan Hadesworkout
Tapruwan Hadesworkout
Tapruwan Hadesworkout